The connected 3-regular (cubic) simple graphs are listed for small vertex numbers.

Connectivity
The number of connected simple cubic graphs on 4, 6, 8, 10, ... vertices  is  1, 2, 5, 19, ... . A classification according to edge connectivity is made as follows: the 1-connected and 2-connected graphs are defined as usual. This leaves the other graphs in the 3-connected class because each
3-regular graph can be split by cutting all edges adjacent to any of the vertices. To refine this definition in the light of the algebra of coupling of angular momenta (see below), a subdivision of the 3-connected graphs is helpful. We shall call
 Non-trivially 3-connected those that can be split by 3 edge cuts into sub-graphs with at least two vertices remaining in each part
 Cyclically 4-connected—all those not 1-connected, not 2-connected, and not non-trivially 3-connected
This declares the numbers 3 and 4 in the fourth column of the tables below.

Pictures
Ball-and-stick models of the graphs in another column of the
table show the vertices and edges in the style of
images of molecular bonds.
Comments on the individual pictures contain
girth, diameter, Wiener index,
Estrada index and Kirchhoff index.  Aut is the order of the Automorphism group of the graph.
A Hamiltonian circuit (where present) is indicated by enumerating vertices
along that path from 1 upwards.
(The positions of the vertices have been defined by minimizing a pair potential defined by the squared difference of the Euclidean and graph theoretic distance, placed in a Molfile, then rendered by Jmol.)

LCF notation
The LCF notation is a notation by Joshua Lederberg, Coxeter and Frucht, for the representation of cubic graphs that are Hamiltonian.

The two edges along the cycle adjacent to any of the vertices are not written down.

Let  be the vertices of the graph and describe the Hamiltonian circle along the  vertices by the edge sequence .

The vector  of the  integers is a suitable, although not unique, representation of the cubic Hamiltonian graph. This is augmented by two additional rules:
 avoid repetition of a sequence of  if these are periodic and replace them by an exponential notation.
Since the starting vertex of the path is of no importance, the numbers in the representation may be cyclically permuted. If a graph contains different Hamiltonian circuits, one may select one of these to accommodate the notation. The same graph may have different LCF notations, depending on precisely how the vertices are arranged.

Often the anti-palindromic representations with

are preferred (if they exist), and the redundant part is then replaced by a semicolon and a dash "; –".

Table

4 vertices

6 vertices

8 vertices

10 vertices

12 vertices

The LCF entries are absent above if the graph has no Hamiltonian cycle,  which is rare (see Tait's conjecture). In this case a list of edges between pairs of vertices labeled 0 to n−1 in the third column serves as an identifier.

Vector coupling coefficients

Each 4-connected (in the above sense) simple cubic graph on  vertices defines a class of quantum mechanical j symbols. Roughly speaking, each vertex represents a 3-jm symbol, the graph is converted to a digraph by assigning signs to the angular momentum quantum numbers , the vertices are labelled with a handedness representing the order of the three  (of the three edges) in the 3jm symbol, and the graph represents a sum over the product of all these numbers assigned to the vertices.

There are 1 (6j), 1 (9j), 2 (12j), 5 (15j), 18 (18j), 84 (21j), 607 (24j), 6100 (27j), 78824 (30j), 1195280 (33j), 20297600 (36j), 376940415 (39j) etc. of these .

If they are equivalent to certain vertex-induced binary trees (cutting one edge and finding a cut that splits the remaining graph into two trees), they are representations of recoupling coefficients, and are then also known as Yutsis graphs .

See also
 3-jm symbol
 6-j symbol

References
 
 
 
 
 
 
 
 
 
 
 
 
 
 
 

Regular graphs
Cubic graphs